{{DISPLAYTITLE:C24H30O6}}
The molecular formula C24H30O6 may refer to:

 Eplerenone, a steroidal antimineralocorticoid of the spirolactone group
 Estriol triacetate, an estrogen medication and an estrogen ester